Spinning Gold is an upcoming American biographical drama film written and directed by Timothy Scott Bogart. It is based on the life of his father, Casablanca Records founder Neil Bogart.

The film is scheduled to be released in theaters on March 31, 2023.

Premise
Depicts the life and career of record producer and Casablanca Records founder Neil Bogart, who was credited with discovering many iconic musical acts such as Donna Summer, Kiss, Village People; and signing and pushing acts including Gladys Knight and the Pips and the Isley Brothers to greater heights.

Cast

Production
The project was originally announced in September 2011, with Timothy Scott Bogart writing and directing the feature about his late father. Justin Timberlake was cast as Bogart. In October 2013, Spike Lee was in talks to direct the film. In January 2014, the film was delayed due to the Envision Entertainment scandal.

In June 2019, Deadline reported that Timothy Bogart would direct the film, with Jeremy Jordan now cast as Bogart, and Samuel L. Jackson, Kenan Thompson, Jason Isaacs and Jason Derulo amongst the extensive cast. Richard Dreyfuss and Sebastian Maniscalco were added to the cast in August.

In June 2021, new cast members were announced, including Wiz Khalifa replacing Jackson and newcomer Casey Likes playing Gene Simmons.

Filming
Filming began on July 16, 2019, in Montreal, with plans to wrap on September 20. On August 23, Canadian actors' union ACTRA issued a "Do Not Work" order forbidding its members from working on the film, alleging the producers were "unfair engagers for failure to meet payroll obligations." As of June 17, 2021, filming had begun in New Jersey.

Release
The film is scheduled to be released in theaters on March 31, 2023.

References

External links
 

Upcoming films
2023 drama films
2020s American films
2020s biographical drama films
2020s English-language films
American biographical drama films
Biographical films about businesspeople
Cultural depictions of Kiss (band)
Films produced by Laurence Mark
Films set in the 1970s
Films shot in Montreal
Films shot in New Jersey
Upcoming English-language films
Works about the music industry